Mary Mercedes Shirley  (January 6, 1926 - January 29, 1999) was an American actress. She appeared in television programs including The Twilight Zone, 77 Sunset Strip, The Invaders, Alfred Hitchcock Presents and Gunsmoke. Shirley died in January 1999 of natural causes at her home in Sherman Oaks, California, at the age of 73.

Television

References

External links 

American actresses
1926 births
1999 deaths